The Hunks is a reality television series which first aired on 19 April 2011 on Sky Living. The series follows 10 "Hunky" males spending the summer in Newquay, Cornwall and lasted for 6 Episodes until 24 May 2011.

The series was never released on DVD and there has been no official confirmation of a second series from Sky.

Cast 
Mario Bundalian
Joryl Peter Laserna
Leandro Dayot
Kevin Roa
Anton Reyes
 Andy Bradley
 Dom Carpenter
 Florian Raffone
 Jamie Spencer
 Marc Burgum
 Sam Grant
 Samy Thompson
 Sean Chard
 Vaughan Bailey

References

External links 
 
 

2011 British television series debuts
2011 British television series endings
2010s British reality television series
English-language television shows
Sky Living original programming
Television shows set in Cornwall